The Natomas Men's Professional Tennis Tournament was a tennis tournament held in Sacramento, California, United States from  2005 until 2015. The event was part of the ATP Challenger Tour and was played on outdoor hard courts.

Past finals

Singles

Doubles

External links 

 
ATP Challenger Tour